The Helena Bighorns are a Junior A ice hockey team in the North American 3 Hockey League (NA3HL) based in Helena, Montana United States. The team plays their home games at the 1,600-seat Helena Ice Arena.

The Bighorns were members of the NorPac from 2007 to 2011. In 2011, the American West Division of the NorPac league broke away to form the American West Hockey League. In March 2014, the NA3HL accepted the AWHL as a new Frontier Division.

History
The original Helena Bighorns were members of the former Tier II America West Hockey League from 2001 to 2003 after replacing the departed Helena Gold Rush that had operated last in the 1999–2000 season (formerly known as the Helena Ice Pirates from 1994 to 1999). In 2003, the AWHL merged with the larger Tier II North American Hockey League and the Bighorns played in the NAHL until 2006.

In 2004, the Tier III Northern Pacific Hockey League (NorPac) expanded into Helena with the Queen City Cutthroats and were immediately successful, winning the Cascade Cup in their first year. In 2006, the NAHL Bighorns withdrew from the NAHL and the NorPac franchise would take the name of the formerly higher level team beginning with the 2006–07 season.

NorPac years (2004–11)
The Helena Bighorns/Queen City Cutthroats won six straight NorPac America West Division Championships between 2005 and 2010. They also won the NorPac Cascade Cup six times, 2005, 2006 and four straight from 2008 to 2011.

American West years (2011–14)
The Helena Bighorns have won three straight American West Hockey League Championships in the 2011–12, 2012–13, and 2013–14 AWHL seasons prior to the league merging with the North American 3 Hockey League (NA3HL) in 2014.

North American 3 Hockey League (2014–present)
For many years, the team and the arena were owned by Oren Koules, president of Evolution Entertainment and former part-owner of the Tampa Bay Lightning (NHL). However, in 2017,  he was looking to sell off the team or cease operations. In May 2017, he sold the team to local businessman Randy Rose. Koules remained the owner of Helena Ice Arena. In 2021, the team was sold to a local ownership group Treasure State Sports Group LTD, composed of Jedidiah Snyder and Michael Greene.

Season-by-season records

Tier III Junior Hockey National Championship
In 2005 and 2006, the Queen City Cutthroats participated in the USA Hockey Tier III Junior B National Tournament. In 2007, NorPac and its teams were promoted to Tier III Junior A status and the Bighorns competed in the 2008, 2009, 2010, 2011 Junior A National Tournaments. In 2011, USA Hockey dropped the A and B designations but sometimes had the leagues split into different divisions during the tournament (American/National for 2012 or Div 1/Div 2 for 2015 with 2013 and 2014 having all leagues compete in one tournament). The Bighorns represented the American West Hockey League in 2012, 2013, and 2014.

In 2011, the Helena Bighorns won the Tier III Junior A Hockey National Championships by defeating the El Paso Rhinos 5-1 in Rochester, Minnesota. The Helena Bighorns won the bronze medal at the 2014 USA Hockey Tier III National championships.

Round robin play in pool with top 4 teams advancing to semi-final.

Alumni
The Bighorns have had a number of alumni move on to NCAA Division I, Division III, ACHA collegiate programs, higher levels of junior ice hockey, and professional ice hockey.

References

External links 
Official site
NA3HL Official Website

Ice hockey teams in Montana
American West Hockey League teams
Defunct North American Hockey League teams
Ice hockey clubs established in 2004
2004 establishments in Montana
Helena, Montana